Marin Šverko (born 4 February 1998) is a Croatian professional footballer who plays as a left-back for  club Venezia, on loan from Groningen.

Club career
Šverko went through the youth ranks of Karlsruher SC. On 27 November 2016, the 14th matchday of the 2016–17 season, he made his debut on the first team of Karlsruher SC in a 0–0 game against 1. FC Kaiserslautern.

In January 2017, Šverko moved to 1. FSV Mainz 05 on a deal until 2021. On 25 February 2017, he made his debut for Mainz' reserve team in the 3. Liga in a 3–1 win against Preußen Münster. After four more games for Mainz II, Šverko and the team was relegated to the Regionalliga.

For the 2018–19 season, Šverko returned to Karlsruher SC on loan. At the beginning of the season he was injured and therefore lost the competition for the position of the left back against Damian Roßbach. Therefore, he made only two league appearances since his return. His loan was not extended, so he returned to Mainz and played another 15 games in the first half of the 2019–20 Regionalliga season. On 21 January 2020, he was loaned out to 3. Liga team SG Sonnenhof Großaspach until the end of the season.

In August 2020, he moved to 3. Liga club 1. FC Saarbrücken on a deal until June 2022.

On 31 January 2023, Šverko joined Venezia in Italian Serie B on loan until the end of the 2022–23 season.

References

External links
 
 Marin Šverko at HNS
 Career stats & Profile - Voetbal International

1998 births
Sportspeople from Pforzheim
Footballers from Baden-Württemberg
German people of Croatian descent
Living people
Association football fullbacks
German footballers
Croatian footballers
Croatia youth international footballers
Croatia under-21 international footballers
Karlsruher SC II players
Karlsruher SC players
1. FSV Mainz 05 II players
SG Sonnenhof Großaspach players
1. FC Saarbrücken players
FC Groningen players
Venezia F.C. players
2. Bundesliga players
Bundesliga players
3. Liga players
Eredivisie players
Croatian expatriate footballers
Expatriate footballers in the Netherlands
Croatian expatriate sportspeople in the Netherlands
Expatriate footballers in Italy
Croatian expatriate sportspeople in Italy